The following is a list of county routes in Sussex County in the U.S. state of New Jersey.  For more information on the county route system in New Jersey as a whole, including its history, see County routes in New Jersey.

500-series county routes
In addition to those listed below, the following 500-series county routes serve Sussex County:
CR 515, CR 517, CR 519, CR 521, CR 560, CR 565

Other county routes

See also

References

External links

 
Sussex